Behind The Player: Munky is an Interactive Music Video featuring Korn guitarist Munky. Released on November 1, 2008 by IMV, the DVD features Munky giving in-depth guitar lessons for how to play "Blind" and "Falling Away from Me" by Korn and an intimate behind-the scenes look at his life as a professional musician, including rare photos and video.  The DVD also includes Munky jamming the two tracks with Korn drummer Ray Luzier, VideoTab that shows exactly how Munky plays his parts in the two songs, as well as other bonus material.

IMV donates $.25 from the sale of each Behind the Player DVD to Little Kids Rock, an organization that gets instruments in the hands of underprivileged kids.

Contents
Behind The Player
Munky talks about his background, influences and gear, including rare photos and video

"Blind" by Korn
Lesson: Munky gives an in-depth guitar lesson for how to play the song
Jam: Munky jams the track with Korn drummer Ray Luzier
VideoTab: Animated tablature shows exactly how Munky plays the track, with both 6- and 7-string versions

"Falling Away from Me" by Korn
Lesson: Munky gives an in-depth guitar lesson for how to play the song
Jam: Munky jams the track with Korn drummer Ray Luzier
VideoTab: Animated tablature shows exactly how Munky plays the track, with both 6- and 7-string versions

Special features
Bonus Video Clip
Photo Album
Little Kids Rock promotional video

Personnel

Produced By: Ken Mayer & Sean E Demott
Directed By: Dean Karr
Producer: Leon Melas
Executive Producer: Rick Donaleshen
Associate Producer: Jamie Tiessere
Director Of Photography: Ken Barrows
Sound Engineer: Tim Harkins
Edited By: Jeff Morose
Mixed By: Matt Chidgy & Cedrick Courtois
Graphics By: Thayer Demay
Transcription By: Thayer DeMay
Camera Operators: Chris Shaw, Mike Chateneuf, Kieth Mcnulty, Doug Cragoe
Gaffer: John Parker

Technical Director: Tyler Bourns
Assistant Director: Matt Pick
Production Assistant: Laine Proctor
Lighting And Grip: Mcnulty Nielson
Artist Hospitality: Sasha Mayer
Shot At: Korn Studios 
Special Guest: Ray Luzier
Cover Photo By: Sébastien Paquet
Video Courtesy Of: Danny “Hamcam” Hamilton, Sébastien Paquet, Korn Partnership Llc
Photos Courtesy Of: Neil Zlozower, Sébastien Paquet, James Shaffer, Reggie Arvizu, Dina Arvizu, Roxanne Robinson

References

External links
Official website

Behind the Player